In mathematics and statistics, the quasi-arithmetic mean or generalised f-mean or Kolmogorov-Nagumo-de Finetti mean is one generalisation of the more familiar means such as the arithmetic mean and the geometric mean, using a function . It is also called Kolmogorov mean after Soviet mathematician Andrey Kolmogorov. It is a broader generalization than the regular generalized mean.

Definition

If f is a function which maps an interval  of the real line to the real numbers, and is both continuous and injective, the f-mean of  numbers

We require f to be injective in order for the inverse function  to exist.

Examples 

According to the f-mean properties, the result does not depend on the base of the logarithm as long as it is positive and not 1.
The LogSumExp function is a smooth maximum: a smooth approximation to the maximum function.

Properties 

Idempotency: for all x,  .

Monotonicity:  is monotonic in each of its arguments (since   is monotonic).

Continuity:   is continuous in each of its arguments  (since   is continuous).

Replacement: Subsets of elements can be averaged a priori, without altering the mean, given that the multiplicity of elements is maintained. With  it holds:

Partitioning: The computation of the mean can be split into computations of equal sized sub-blocks:

Self-distributivity: For any quasi-arithmetic mean  of two variables: .

Mediality: For any quasi-arithmetic mean  of two variables:.

Balancing: For any quasi-arithmetic mean  of two variables:.

Central limit theorem : Under regularity conditions, for a sufficiently large sample,  is approximately normal.
A similar result is available for Bajraktarević means, which are generalizations of quasi-arithmetic means.

Scale-invariance: The quasi-arithmetic mean is invariant with respect to offsets and scaling of :  .

Characterization 
There are several different sets of properties that characterize the quasi-arithmetic mean (i.e., each function that satisfies these properties is an f-mean for some function f).

 Mediality is essentially sufficient to characterize quasi-arithmetic means.
 Self-distributivity is essentially sufficient to characterize quasi-arithmetic means.
 Replacement: Kolmogorov proved that the five properties of symmetry, fixed-point, monotonicity, continuity, and replacement fully characterize the quasi-arithmetic means.
 Balancing: An interesting problem is whether this condition (together with symmetry, fixed-point, monotonicity and continuity properties) implies that the mean is quasi-arithmetic. Georg Aumann showed in the 1930s that the answer is no in general, but that if one additionally assumes  to be an analytic function then the answer is positive.

Homogeneity 

Means are usually homogeneous, but for most functions , the f-mean is not.
Indeed, the only homogeneous quasi-arithmetic means are the power means (including the geometric mean); see Hardy–Littlewood–Pólya, page 68.

The homogeneity property can be achieved by normalizing the input values by some (homogeneous) mean .

However this modification may violate monotonicity and the partitioning property of the mean.

See also 
 Generalized mean
 Jensen's inequality

References 

 Andrey Kolmogorov (1930) “On the Notion of Mean”, in “Mathematics and Mechanics” (Kluwer 1991) — pp. 144–146.
 Andrey Kolmogorov (1930) Sur la notion de la moyenne. Atti Accad. Naz. Lincei 12, pp. 388–391.
 John Bibby (1974) “Axiomatisations of the average and a further generalisation of monotonic sequences,” Glasgow Mathematical Journal, vol. 15, pp. 63–65.
 Hardy, G. H.; Littlewood, J. E.; Pólya, G. (1952) Inequalities. 2nd ed. Cambridge Univ. Press, Cambridge, 1952.
 B. De Finetti, “Sul concetto di media”, vol. 3, p. 36996, 1931, istituto italiano degli attuari.

Means